Trophonella shackletoni is a species of sea snail, a marine gastropod mollusk in the family Muricidae, the murex snails or rock snails.

Description

Distribution

References

 Engl W. (2012) Shells of Antarctica. Hackenheim: Conchbooks. 402 pp.

External links
 Charles Hedley (1911), Mollusca;  British Antarctic Expedition, 1907–9, under the command of Sir E.H. Shackleton, c.v.o. Reports on the scientific investigations .. (1910) vol. 1–2
 BARCO A., SCHIAPARELLI S., HOUART R., OLIVERIO M. (2012). Cenozoic evolution of Muricidae (Mollusca, Neogastropoda) in the Southern Ocean, with the description of a new subfamily. ZOOLOGICA SCRIPTA, vol. 41, pp. 596–616

Gastropods described in 1911
Trophonella